The 1904 VFL Grand Final was an Australian rules football game contested between the Fitzroy Football Club and Carlton Football Club, held at the Melbourne Cricket Ground in Melbourne on 17 September 1904. It was the seventh annual Grand Final of the Victorian Football League, staged to determine the premiers for the 1904 VFL season. The match, attended by 32,688 spectators, was won by Fitzroy by a margin of 24 points, marking that club's third premiership victory.

Right to challenge
This season was played under the amended Argus system. Fitzroy was the minor premier, and Carlton had finished second. The teams both qualified for this match by winning their semi-finals matches.

If Carlton had won this match, Fitzroy would have had the right to challenge Carlton to a rematch for the premiership on the following weekend, because Fitzroy had the best record in the league. The winner of that match would then have won the premiership.

Teams

 Field umpire – Henry "Ivo" Crapp
 Boundary umpire – Bert Wregg

Statistics

Goalkickers

See also
 1904 VFL season

References

VFL/AFL Grand Finals
Grand
Fitzroy Football Club
Carlton Football Club
September 1904 sports events